Ernest Faram Atkins (26 April 1890 – 14 September 1972) was an Australian rules footballer.

Atkins spent his short career of 23 games, playing for University in the Victorian Football League (VFL). He kicked 7 goals.

Atkins's son Jack Atkins played for Melbourne.

Footnotes

References
 Councillor's Son to Marry, THe (Melbourne) Herald, (Tuesday, 14 March 1916), p.7.

External links

1890 births
1972 deaths
University Football Club players
Australian rules footballers from Melbourne
People from South Melbourne